The Main Street Bridge in Columbus, Ohio is a , three-span, inclined tied arch bridge over the Scioto River. The bridge is the first in North America and the fifth in the world to use an inclined single-rib-tied arch superstructure. The final cost for the bridge was $60.1 million. It carries Main Street (U.S. Route 62 and Ohio State Route 3) northwest from Downtown Columbus into Franklinton, splitting into Rich and Starling Streets just west of the bridge.

History

The original Main Street bridge was a Whipple through truss bridge built in 1890 over the Scioto River. It was lengthened in 1917 using two spans salvaged from a railroad bridge a short distance downstream of the bridge. In the 1930s, it was replaced with a multiple-span, art-deco open-spandrel concrete deck arch bridge, built in 1937. After years of degradation due to weather and traffic, the bridge was deemed unfit for use and closed in 2002. The 1937 bridge was part of the Scioto River Bridge Group, listed on the Columbus Register of Historic Properties in 1983 and proposed as part of the Columbus Civic Center Historic District, nominated to the National Register of Historic Places in 1988.

Wanting an iconic structure to replace the old bridge, the city of Columbus contracted Dr. Spiro Pollalis, professor of design technology and management at the Harvard University Graduate School of Design to design the bridge.  His design, altered slightly for budget reasons, opened for traffic on July 30, 2010.

When the former bridge closed, engineers estimated that a replacement would cost approximately $19.5 million.  However, by 2004, estimates climbed $29.5 million.  When planners received construction bids in 2006, the lowest was $44.1 million.  Cost overruns, design changes and inspections added another $10 million to the structure's final cost.

Design

Arch
The original concept of the Main Street bridge was far more complex and costly than the final design. Initially, the bridge called for a very shallow 10:1 span-to-rise ratio for the main arch, creating significant axial and bending forces. To accommodate the excess forces, the design called for expensive, high-strength concrete and steel to support the bridge.

Bridge deck
While the redesign of the original concept altered the deck supports, the actual construction of the decks changed only slightly to accommodate the new design.

L-struts
The Main Street bridge also calls for thirteen L-struts, which would attach the arch to the bridge deck. Their original design used tapering geometries which were different for each strut. Creating, designing and testing thirteen distinct struts would have been cost-prohibitive, so engineers simplified the designs to reduce costs.

Piers
The final redesign of the Main street bridge was of the piers.  The original design called for two 'V-piers', formed by the convergence of the main arch and the secondary arches on either side. This design proved to be nearly impossible to make structurally sound forcing engineers to simplify the piers. To do so they created a 'crescent pier' shape, which removes the two smaller arches on either end and creates a larger pier to provide better support.

Gallery

References

External links

Main Street Bridge at Bridges & Tunnels

Bridges completed in 2010
Bridges in Columbus, Ohio
Bridges of the United States Numbered Highway System
Bridges over the Scioto River
Concrete bridges in the United States
Downtown Columbus, Ohio
Open-spandrel deck arch bridges in the United States
Road bridges in Ohio
Steel bridges in the United States
Tied arch bridges in the United States
U.S. Route 62